Shain Mahaffey Neumeier (born 1987) is an American autistic and nonbinary transgender attorney from Los Angeles, California. Neumeier advocates against coercive and forced treatment, including advocacy to close the Judge Rotenberg Center, an institution for people with developmental disabilities. They are also an activist for autism rights, disability rights, and other associated causes. Neumeier has multiple disabilities including post-traumatic stress disorder and cleft lip and palate.

Neumeier studied at Smith College and Suffolk University Law School and later worked on youth rights policy issues for CAFETY.  As an attorney, they are in solo practice in Massachusetts.  Their law practice represents people facing petitions for involuntary commitment.

Activism
Neumeier advocates against coercive and forced treatment, and has called for the closure of the Judge Rotenberg Center (JRC), an institution which uses electric skin shock aversion therapy on people with developmental disabilities.  Neumeier also testified before the United Nations special rapporteur on torture about the JRC.

References

External links
Neumeier's personal blog
Neumeier's law firm

1987 births
American abortion-rights activists
American people with disabilities
Autism activists
Autism rights movement
American disability rights activists
LGBT people from Massachusetts
American LGBT rights activists
Living people
Massachusetts lawyers
Non-binary activists
People from Springfield, Massachusetts
People on the autism spectrum
People with mood disorders
People with post-traumatic stress disorder
LGBT lawyers
Transgender non-binary people
Transgender rights activists
Youth rights people